Charles is a given name.

Charles may also refer to:

People
Charles (surname)
King Charles (disambiguation), various monarchs
Prince Charles (disambiguation), various princes
Charles III (born 1948), King of the United Kingdom and the other Commonwealth realms

Places
Charles, Providence, Rhode Island
Charles, Devon, a hamlet in the North Devon district of Devon, England
Charles Bridge, in the Czech Republic
Charles City, Iowa
Charles County, Maryland
Charles City County, Virginia
Charles Island, Connecticut
Charles River, in Boston, Massachusetts
The Charles, a building on the Upper East Side in New York City

Vehicles
HMS Charles, various ships of the British Royal Navy
USS Charles (ID-1298), a United States Navy troop transport in commission from 1918 to 1920

Film and television 
 Charles "Chuck" Bass, a character in the American television series Gossip Girl
 Charles Deetz, a character in the 1988 American fantasy comedy movie Beetlejuice
 Charles "Chuck" McGill, a character in the American television series Better Call Saul
 Charles “Charlie” St. George, a character in the Netflix series 13 Reasons Why
 Charles "Monty" Burns, a character in the animated television series The Simpsons
 Charles, the main character in the American sitcom television series Charles in Charge
 Dr. Charles Lowell, a character in the American sitcom television series Kate & Allie
 Major Charles Emerson Winchester III , a character in the TV series M*A*S*H

Other uses
 "Charles" (short story), a short story by Shirley Jackson
 Charles's law, a law describing the relationship between the volume and temperature of a gas
 Charles Proxy, an HTTP debugging proxy
 Charles University, Prague
 A lunar crater near Mons La Hire

See also

 
 Sir Charles (disambiguation)
 Lord Charles (disambiguation)
 Charleston (disambiguation)
 Charlie (disambiguation)
 Chucky (disambiguation)